The silver-crowned friarbird (Philemon argenticeps) is a species of bird in the family Meliphagidae.
It is endemic to northern Australia.

Its natural habitats are subtropical or tropical dry forests and subtropical or tropical mangrove forests.

References

silver-crowned friarbird
Birds of the Northern Territory
Birds of Cape York Peninsula
Endemic birds of Australia
silver-crowned friarbird
Taxonomy articles created by Polbot